Devil's Hole State Park is a  state park located in Niagara County, New York, north of the City of Niagara Falls. The day-use park overlooks the lower Niagara River Gorge.

History
Devil's Hole State Park occupies a location that was historically an important portage used by Native Americans to transport canoes around Niagara Falls and rapids on the Niagara River. It was the location of an early battle between European settlers and Native Americans over control of the portage route.

The park was opened in 1924, and is one of the oldest state parks in the region, although it was preceded by Niagara Falls State Park.

Description
Devil's Hole State Park is a  day-use park that allows fishing, hiking, picnic tables, snowshoeing, and cross-country skiing. A popular trail descends into the Niagara River Gorge to allow close access to the rapids below, however off-trail hiking is prohibited due to dangerous conditions.

The park is connected with nearby Whirlpool State Park via the Devil's Hole Trail at the gorge's bottom, as well as a trail along the gorge's rim, which together form a complete loop.

See also
 List of New York state parks

References

External links
 New York State Parks: Devil's Hole State Park

The folklore attributed to Devil’s Hole is covered in Episode 1 of the “I Scream Social” podcast hosted by Abby Schiesser.

Lewiston (town), New York
State parks of New York (state)
Parks in Niagara County, New York